Pitch and putt World Strokeplay Championship is the single world competition organized by the Federation of International Pitch and Putt Associations (FIPPA) played biannually.

World Strokeplay Championship 2009
The first championship was played in April, 2009, at La Grande Motte course, in France, and crowned Catalan player Fernando Cano as World Champion.

World Strokeplay Championship 2013
The first championship was played in July, 2013, at Tambre course, and crowned Irish player John Walsh as World Champion.

References
 Results
 News at FIPPA website
 2013 Results

Pitch and putt competitions